Blackwood Forest Recreation Park is a protected area located about  south  of the Adelaide city centre in the suburb of Hawthorndene.  The recreation park was proclaimed under the National Parks and Wildlife Act 1972 in 2001 to retain land purchased in 1908 by the Government of South Australia for use as open space for recreational purposes.  The recreation park is classified as an IUCN Category III protected area.

See also
 List of protected areas in Adelaide

References

Recreation Parks of South Australia
Protected areas in Adelaide
Protected areas established in 2001
2001 establishments in Australia